Kudankulam Nuclear Power Plant (or Kudankulam NPP or KKNPP) is the largest nuclear power station in India, situated in Kudankulam in the Tirunelveli district of the southern Indian state of Tamil Nadu. Construction on the plant began on 31 March 2002, but faced several delays due to opposition from local fishermen. KKNPP is scheduled to have six VVER-1000 reactors built in collaboration with Atomstroyexport, the Russian state company and Nuclear Power Corporation of India Limited (NPCIL), with an installed capacity of 6,000 MW of electricity.

Unit 1 was synchronised with the southern power grid on 22 October 2013 and since then, has been generating electricity at its warranted limit of 1,000 MW. The original cost of the two units was  13,171 crore, but it was later revised to  17,270 crore (US$2.6 billion). Russia advanced a credit of  6,416 crore (US$0.97 billion) for both the units. Unit 2 attained criticality on 10 July 2016 and was synchronised with the electricity grid on 29 August.

In 2015, Nuclear Power Corporation Ltd (NPCIL) announced a price of  4.29/kW·h (6.4 ¢/kW·h) for energy delivered from Kudankulam nuclear power plant.

The ground-breaking ceremony for construction of units 3 & 4 was performed on 17 February 2016. Due to technology changes, inflation and insistence of the supplier and operator for additional liability insurance the construction cost of units 3 & 4 amounted to twice the cost of units 1 & 2 and was later revised to be .
A budget of  has been approved for construction of Units 5 & 6.

History

Background

An Inter-Governmental Agreement (IGA) on the project was signed on 20 November 1988 by the Prime Minister of India, Rajiv Gandhi and the Soviet head of state, Mikhail Gorbachev, for the construction of two reactors. The project remained in limbo for a decade due to the dissolution of the Soviet Union. There were also objections from the United States, on the grounds that the agreement did not meet the 1992 terms of the Nuclear Suppliers Group (NSG). M R Srinivasan, Atomic Energy Commission (AEC) Chairman from 1987 to 1990, called the project "a non-starter". However, the project was revived on 21 June 1998.

Construction
Construction began on 31 March 2002, with Nuclear Power Corporation of India Ltd (NPCIL) predicting that the first unit would be operational in March 2007, instead of the original target of December 2007.

A small port became operational in Kudankulam on 14 January 2004. Until 2004, materials had to be brought in via road from the port of Thoothukudi, risking damage during transportation. In 2008, negotiations on building four additional reactors at the site began. Though the capacity of these reactors had not been declared, it was expected that the capacity of each reactor will be 1,200 MW (1.2 GW). The new reactors would bring the total capacity of the power plant to 6,800 MW (6.8 GW).

The ground-breaking ceremony for construction of third and fourth units was performed on 17 February 2016 and AERB authorised the first pour of concrete on 19 June 2017. Construction of the third and fourth units started on 29 June 2017.  AERB granted excavation permit for Unit 5 and 6 in 14 November 2018 and concerete pour begun in 2020. Construction of units 5 and 6 commenced on 29 June 2021. Unit 5 is expected to be ready for commissioning in December 2026, while unit 6 is expected to be ready by September 2027.

Cyber-attack
In 2019, NPCIL confirmed identification of malware in the internet connected administrative network but said that the critical internal network was isolated. KNPP officials had earlier termed reports on the cyber attack as false. The malware was linked to the North Korea based Lazarus Group.

Design and specification
The reactors are pressurised water reactor of Russian design, model VVER-1000/V-412 referred also as AES-92. Thermal capacity is 3,000 MW, gross electrical capacity is 1,000 MW with a net capacity of 917 MW. Construction is by NPCIL and Atomstroyexport. When completed the plant will become the largest nuclear power generation complex in India producing a cumulative 2 GW of electric power. Both units are water-cooled, water-moderated power reactors.

Operations
The first reactor of the plant attained criticality on 13 July 2013 and was connected to the grid three months later. It started commercial operation from 31 December 2014. The second unit achieved criticality on 10 July 2016 and was connected to the grid in August. Commercial operation started on 15 October 2016.

The Kerala State Electricity Board (KSEB) board members have approved signing of a power purchase agreement (PPA) with the Nuclear Power Corporation of India (NPCIL) for sourcing electricity from the Kudankulam nuclear power project (KKNPP).

Unit 1 was shut down in June 2015 for refuelling and annual maintenance. On 21 January 2016 the reactor restarted and was connected to grid on 30 January 2016.

Kudankulam Nuclear Power Project Site Director D.S. Choudhary stated on 26 January 2018 that units 1 and 2 of the nuclear plant had generated a combined total of 22,800 million units since they began functioning.

Opposition
People had been opposing the plant since its proposal in 1979. The proposal however, was halted because of the protests. It was brought back in 2000, and construction started under the government of Atal Bihari Vajpayee.

In 2011, thousands from the vicinity of the plant protested against it, fearing a nuclear disaster, in the wake of the Fukushima Daiichi nuclear disaster According to the protesters, evacuation of people in the event of a nuclear disaster would be impossible. According to S P Udayakumar, of the People's Movement Against Nuclear Energy, "the nuclear plant is unsafe". However, in 2012, the chief of India's nuclear energy programme, Dr Srikumar Banerjee, called the plant "one of the safest" in the world. In December 2012, The Hindu reported that hundreds of villagers in the region were largely ignorant of the risks and benefits of the plant.

A Public Interest Litigation (PIL) was filed in 2011 with the Supreme Court asking for nuclear power development to be delayed until safety concerns were independently assessed. In May 2013, the Supreme Court ruled in favour of the plant, stating that the nuclear power plant was in the larger public interest.

In March 2012, nearly 200 anti-nuclear protesters were detained for a few hours by the police. The protesters were set to join protests objecting resumption of work of one of two 1 GW reactors, a day after the local government restarted work on the project.

There have also been rallies and protests in favour of commissioning this nuclear power plant.

On, 24 February 2012, Prime Minister Manmohan Singh blamed foreign NGOs for protests at the power plant. News agencies reported that three NGOs had diverted donations earmarked for religious and social causes to the protests, in violation of foreign exchange regulations.

Supporters of the power plant in Idinthakarai village have been targeted by opponents using improvised explosive devices.

The Church of South India and the National Council of Churches opposed the power plant and supported the protests against it. Supporters of the power plant and the government have alleged that the protest against the power plant was instigated by churches and funded by foreign sources. The protestors dismissed the allegation of foreign funding, but said that seeking support from church was "natural" as many protestors were Christian localities living in the vicinity of the Reactor.

Response from officials
Former chairman of Atomic Energy Commission of India Srinivasan said, "The Fukushima plant was built on a beach-front, but the Kudankulam was constructed on a solid terrain and that too keeping all the safety aspects in mind. Also, we are not in a tsunami prone area. The plants in Kudankulam have a double containment system which can withstand high pressure. At least  14,000 crore has been spent. If we don't operate the plant immediately, it will affect the economic stability of our country".

A centre panel constituted by the Government of India, which did a survey of the safety features in the plant, vouched for the safety of the Kudankulam reactors. Dr Muthunayagam, who headed the panel, said that the protesters asked for some documents which are not related to the safety of the reactor. Nuclear scientist and principal scientific adviser to the federal Government of India Rajagopala Chidambaram has said "We have learnt lessons from the Fukushima nuclear accident, particularly on the post-shut-down cooling system", and also added Fukushima nuclear accident should not deter or inhibit India from pursuing a safe civil nuclear programme.

The Tamil Nadu state government formed a four-member expert panel which submitted a report to the government after inspecting the safety features of the plant. The Tamil Nadu government in the wake of the acute power shortages in the state has ordered in favour of the commissioning of the plant.

Allocation of power
Government of India announced the power allocation from the two units of the reactor on 29 August 2013.

As of 1st December 2021, the government is considering to increase its capability to 6000 MW, on completion of KKNPP-3 & 4 (2 X 1000 MW) and KKNPP-5 & 6 (2 X 1000 MW) which are presently under construction.

Kudankulam Alley
The town council of Volgodonsk, Rostov Oblast named a lane located next to the Atommash plant as Kudankulam Alley in November 2018. The plant, which is owned by Rosatom, manufactures equipment for the Kudankulam Nuclear Power Plant.

Units

See also

 Nuclear Power Corporation of India
 Nuclear power in India

References

External links
Nuclear Power Corporation of India Ltd
Navigation map of the Nuclear Plant (Tamil language)

Nuclear power stations in Tamil Nadu
Tirunelveli
Nuclear power stations with proposed reactors
India–Soviet Union relations
Nuclear power stations using VVER reactors
Anti-nuclear movement in India
2013 establishments in Tamil Nadu
Cybercrime in India